Mohamed Abdel Latif Grendo, (born 7 August 1991), better known as Grendo, is an Egyptian footballer who plays as a forward for Egyptian Premier League side Al Masry.

Club career 
On 12 September 2019, he was loaned to Haras El Hodoud on a season-long loan deal.

Honours 
Al-Saqr
 Yemeni League: 2013–14
 Yemeni President Cup: 2013–14

References

External links 
 
 

1991 births
Living people
People from Aswan
Egyptian footballers
Association football forwards
Al Masry SC players
Egyptian Premier League players
Haras El Hodoud SC players
Hetten FC players
Egyptian expatriate sportspeople in Saudi Arabia
Egyptian expatriate sportspeople in Yemen